Jimmy Clabby (c. 1890 – c. January 1934) was an American boxer.  He defeated Tommy Uren in 1917 to win the Australian middleweight championship.  He was found dead, of starvation and exposure, at his home in Calumet City, Illinois, near Hammond, in January 1934; in his obituary it was estimated that he had earned and spent over $500,000 during his career as a boxer.  He claimed that his usual way to prepare for a fight was "a shave and a drink".  He was married and had three children.

References 

1930s deaths
Year of birth uncertain
Year of death uncertain
American male boxers
Boxers from Indiana
People from Hammond, Indiana